The , also known as Mazda E-Series and the Ford Econovan, is a cabover van and pickup truck manufactured by the Japanese automobile manufacturer Mazda since 1966. The Bongo name was also used for the Bongo Friendee, which is not a cabover design.

It has been built with rear-, middle-, as well as front-mounted engines. It also formed the basis for the long running Kia Bongo range. It is named for the African Bongo, a type of antelope.



First generation (1966–1975) 

Mazda first introduced its small van, the Bongo, in May 1966. It featured a rear-mounted 782 cc water-cooled OHV SA 4-stroke engine driving the rear wheels. The rear-engined Bongo was produced in two versions from 1968, as the F800 was joined by the bigger-engined F1000. The chassis code for the 1-litre model is FPA. Mazda also showed an electrically powered version of the van, which could reach  and with a  range. but wasn't put into production and remained a prototype. The engines were shared with Mazda's Familia small car range. Production ended in 1975, due to Mazda suffering serious economic troubles and upcoming stricter emissions regulations for 1976, influenced by the original United States Federal Clean Air Act of 1963. This model retained the same body shape for its 10-year production life, the later models fitted with inertia-reel seat belts, and separate front parking indicator lights.

The rear-engined Bongos had a full chassis (using the same Mazda 1000 engine as other variants mounted to a four-speed transaxle at the rear) and were very strong and due to the low gearing, able to carry half a ton. Due to rust and poor maintenance, these Bongos are now rare. The 1000 pickup which was built for commercial uses, and the cargo and passenger vans all used a double wishbone and coil spring suspension for the front wheels, and a trailing-arm suspension and coil springs at the rear wheels.

Due to the popularity of the Bongo, Mazda decided to manufacture a minibus, called the Mazda Parkway starting in 1974 until 1997, shared with the larger Mazda Titan truck platform.

Second generation (1977–1983) 

After a two-year hiatus, the next Bongo van appeared in September 1977. It was a mid-engine rear wheel drive vehicle. Ford sold this version of the van as the Ford Econovan, while Mazda sold it for export as the E1300, E1400, and E1600, depending on engine size. Beginning in October 1979 a 2.2-litre diesel engine was also available in commercial versions, sold in export as the E2200. This appeared in the passenger version "Bongo Multi Wagon" in February 1980. The Bongo Multi Wagon had originally been sold with a 1.8-liter petrol engine only. As the E1600, this model went on sale in Great Britain in 1982, only a year before being replaced. The British market only received the long wheelbase 1-tonne panel van version with small, twinned rear wheels. The UK model has a five-speed manual gearbox with a column mounted shifter.

This generation was also manufactured by Kia in South Korea, as the Kia Bongo and Ceres. The Bongo/Ceres underwent a number of facelifts and was still available as late as 1999.

The original version has round headlights and no grille; after a facelift the second generation Bongo/E-series had rectangular headlights and a more traditional grille. This took place in January 1981. This generation Bongo was the best-selling Mazda vehicle from its introduction until 1981, when it was surpassed by the front-wheel drive Mazda Familia.

In Australia, rebadged versions were sold as the Ford Econovan as a SWB petrol van (with and without side windows), LWB petrol van (with and without side windows), and LWB diesel van guises (windowless). SWB and LWB window petrol vans also sold in passenger-carrying Ford Econowagon form. Luxury-oriented passenger models were sold under the Ford Spectron name as high-roof eight-seaters.

Engines 
 1977–October 1979 1272 cc TC,  /  JIS (Japan) – BA2T8
 1977–1983 1586 cc NA, 80 PS (59 kW) /  JIS (Japan) – BA2N9
 October 1978–198? 1769 cc VC,  JIS (Japan) – BA2V8/BA2V9
 October 1979–1983 1415 cc UC,  /  JIS (Japan) – BA2U9
 October 1979–1983 2209 cc S2,  /  JIS (Japan) - BA2S9

Third generation (1983–1999) 

The Bongo was redesigned in 1983 with new engines. It was also sold by Ford in Asia as the "Spectron" (passenger version) or as the "J80" (cargo model). In Australia, the Bongo was sold by Mazda as the E-series, with Ford also retailing the commercial version as the "Ford Econovan" and the passenger version as the "Ford Spectron" (1983–1990). From 1994 onwards, the Bongo was also sold by Nissan as the Vanette. In South Korea this was built as the Kia Wide Bongo. In South Africa, it was sold as the Ford Spectron.

During the 1980s, Toyota, Nissan, and Mitsubishi all sold versions of their utility vans in the United States, however none achieved any real market success and so Mazda decided not to bring the Bongo to the US. Instead, they created the more passenger car-like MPV for the American market.

Australia
In Australia, it was sold as the Mazda E-series and the Mazda Traveller   and also as the Ford Econovan and Ford Spectron. The entry-level Econovan offered a  length, 1.8-litre petrol engine, five-speed manual of four-speed automatic, single rear wheels, in three-seater steel-sided or six seater XL window-sided forms. Prior to 1986, there was also a 1.4-litre engine and five-speed manual option available as a steel-sided van with single- or dual-rear wheels, and as a passenger-carrying XL van with single-rear wheels.

Dual rear wheels were available for the 2.0-litre petrol or a 2.2-litre diesel, both with five-speed manual and as steel-sided vans.

Powertrain and rear wheel setups were the same as the 4.4-metre Maxi. In 1986, four-wheel drive became an option for the 4.7-metre long model in conjunction with the windowed body work, manual transmission, and 2.0-litre engine. A cab chassis version was offered on the 4.7-metre chassis, with 2.0-litre petrol engine with five-speed manual. It was available as a two-door, three-seater model with  payload and as a four-door, six-seater "Crew Cab" with  payload.

In December 1985, Ford updated the Econovan in Australia to upgrade the engines for unleaded petrol. The petrol engine fitted to 4.0-metre Econovan increased in displacement from 1.4 to 1.8 litres, and the 4.4-metre Maxi had its petrol engine increased from 1.8 to 2.0 litres. The 4.0- and 4.4-metre Econovan also gained the availability of four-speed automatic, previously fitted only to the Spectron vans. The 4.7-metre Maxi van, previously available only with dual rear wheels, was now also available with single rear wheels, although crew cab and cab chassis models remained as dual rear wheel propositions. Ford stated that all petrol manuals and the 4.4-metre petrol automatic Maxi were designed to run on both leaded and unleaded fuel, although the 4.0-metre petrol automatic will run only on unleaded. At the same time as these powertrain updates, Ford also made some cosmetic changes to the Spectron. The low-roof Spectron added colour-keyed bumpers and a new side stripe, matched to a new beige cloth interior trim, and on the XLT the old beige interior colour switched to grey.

Engines 
Petrol
 1984–1985 1415 cc UC
 1983–1988 1789 cc F8
 1983–1988 1998 cc FE

Diesel
 1984–1995 1998 cc Diesel
 1984–1995 2184 cc R2 Diesel
 1984–1995 1998 cc RF Diesel

Bongo Brawny 
A new long-wheelbase version known as the Bongo Brawny was also introduced, three months before the regular Bongo. The Brawny was larger than the regular Bongo in by all key measures (wheelbase, length, width, height, and weight). In export markets this model was again sold as the E-series. In Australia, Ford differentiated the long-wheelbase versions with the "Econovan Maxi" identifier. In Korea, it is also known as Kia Wide Bongo for truck variant and Kia Besta for van variant

Fourth generation (SK/SL; 1999–2020) 

In June 1999, a new generation of Bongo vans and trucks went on sale, which were also rebadged as the Mazda E-series, Ford Econovan, Mitsubishi Delica Van/Truck, and Nissan Vanette. This model adopted the SK platform which was based on the previous generation SS/SE model. This was sold at various Mazda, Mazda Anfini and Mazda Autozam dealers. In August 20, 2010, an upgraded Bongo truck/van were officially released in Japan.

Mazda's difficult business environment at the time meant they could not afford to build a full brand new platform. Mazda announced that this is the last generation of in-house designed Bongo vans and trucks in March 2012. Mazda discontinued the Bongo in 2020 and it will focus on fuel efficient passenger cars.
 November 1999: the Mitsubishi Delica Cargo was Rebadged and released in Japan only.
 December 2003: A new common rail direct fuel injection diesel model was introduced.
 November 2005: Minor updates on exterior lighting.
 2006: the Australian-market E1800 (SKW0) is discontinued.
 August 2007: DPF introduced for diesel engine models. Power windows and central locking were also introduced for all truck models.
 May 2009: due to Nissan's in-house NV200 Vanette, sales of the 2WD petrol models were stopped.
 August 2010: Minor updates for the entire range include the introduction of a new 1.8-litre L8 petrol engine. This required a larger center console box which reduced seating capacity. New model codes (SKP2T/SKP2L) were applied.
 2011: The New Zealand market E1800 (SKW0) was discontinued.
 October 2011: The rebadged Mitsubishi Delica model was discontinued. and shifted to the Nissan NV200 Vanette model.
 March 2012: Mazda announced that this would be the last generation of in-house designed Bongo vans and trucks. They withdrew from commercial vehicle production to focus on fuel efficient passenger cars.
 June 2012: Minor safety updated. Rear decal renewed. MAZDA decal deleted (van only).
 February 2016: Minor updated. New engine tune-up and increase fuel economy, Auto now became five-speed, dual-rear wheels model discontinued, 4W-ABS and Keyless entry for all models, new model codes SLP2V/SLP2M applied.

Bongo Brawny (SK; 1999–2010) 
The longer version of the Bongo, the Bongo Brawny was released in June 1999. This model also adopted the SK platform which is based on previous generation SS/SE model. Like the previous generation, the Bongo Brawny was larger in all key dimensions. It was available in both regular 2400 mm and long 2600 mm wheelbases. The Brawny retained many of the parts of the previous generation, such as the sliding side doors, and looks rather similar to the previous generation model. The E-series label continued to be used in export markets, although they were now fewer than before. The Bongo Brawny was discontinued in August 2010.

 November 1999: the Mitsubishi Delica Cargo was Rebadged and released in Japan only.
 October 2000: The truck model was discontinued due to the introduction of the Mazda Titan Dash 1-ton.
 December 2004: Minor changes include the introduction of a new Common rail direct injection diesel 2.0 RF-CDT engine and new model codes SKF6 applied for diesel models.
 November 2005: Minor updates include the addition of exterior lighting.
 2006: The E2000 MWB(SKX0) and E2000 LWB(SKY0) is discontinued in Australia.
 August 2007: 4WD and GL Super trim levels are discontinued.
 August 2010: The New Zealand-market Bongo Brawny, E2000 (LWB), a rebadged Mitsubishi Delica Cargo, was discontinued.

Bongo Friendee (1995–2005) 

The Bongo Friendee was introduced in June 1995 and is based on the SG platform. It was an eight-seater minivan and it was also sold in the Japanese home market as the Ford Freda.

They are usually (but not exclusively) available in automatic transmissions, and come in 2WD (SGL3) and 4WD (SGL5) versions. The 2.5-litre turbo-diesels are common in Japan, although there is a 2.5-litre V6 petrol version available.

The Mazda Bongo Friendee is an eight-seater minivan. Some had Mazda factory-fitted kitchens installed. Many have also been imported to the UK and converted to camper vans. All of them have fold down seats downstairs to make a double bed, and on many models there is also an "Auto Free Top" elevating roof which can sleep two more people. Flat-top versions were also available.

In September 2001, a facelift version appeared with a revised bodystyle and different engines, although the 2.5 turbo-diesel continued unchanged. Air conditioning, climate control is fitted as standard and electronic blinds and electric side door are commonly fitted options.

Engines 
Petrol
 2.0 L FE SOHC I4
 2.5 L Mazda J engine#J5 V6

Diesel
 2.5 L WL-T turbo-diesel (the same engine is found in the Mazda B-series Pickup truck)

Fifth generation

Bongo Van and Bongo Truck (S400; 2020–present) 
The Bongo was reintroduced in July 2020 in Japan and based on the Daihatsu Gran Max. It is available in van and truck model.

Bongo Brawny (H200; 2019–present) 
The Bongo Brawny was reintroduced in April 2019 in Japan as a badge engineered fifth-generation Toyota HiAce. Unlike the previous model, it is intended to be a larger commercial van as opposed to a passenger van.

References

External links 

 

Bongo
Cab over vehicles
Rear-wheel-drive vehicles
Minivans
Vans
Minibuses
Vehicles introduced in 1966
Pickup trucks